Ahmed Saad Suleiman Osman (Arabic أحمد سعد عثمان; born 7 August 1979) is a former Libyan football attacker who last played for Club Africain in the Tunisian Ligue Professionnelle 1. He also played for the Libya national football team and he featured in the 2009 African Championship of Nations.
He played in the African Nations Cup in 2012.

International goals
Scores and results list Libya's goal tally first.

References

External links

1979 births
Living people
Libyan footballers
Libyan expatriate footballers
Libya international footballers
2006 Africa Cup of Nations players
Association football forwards
Expatriate footballers in Tunisia
Libyan expatriate sportspeople in Tunisia
Club Africain players
2012 Africa Cup of Nations players
Al-Nasr SC (Benghazi) players
Al-Ahli SC (Tripoli) players
Libyan Premier League players
2009 African Nations Championship players
Libya A' international footballers